She Returns to the Floating World is a book of poetry that was written by Jeannine Hall Gailey and published by Kitsune Books in 2011. This collection, Gailey's second, deals with feminine transformations in the personae of characters from Japanese folk tales, anime, and manga.

Poems from the book were featured in Verse Daily, and the haiku "august sky..." won an Honorable Mention in the 12th Mainichi Haiku Contest (2008).

Reviews
Critical reviews of She Returns to the Floating World have appeared in the following literary publications:
 Barn Owl Review
 The California Journal of Poetics
 Mid-American Review
 Midwest Book Review
 New Madrid Journal
 The Rumpus
 Southern Humanities Review
 The US Review of Books
 Web Del Sol Review of Books

References

External links
 Jeannine Hall Gailey's Web site

American poetry collections
2011 poetry books